Hohoe North is one of the constituencies represented in the Parliament of Ghana. It elects one Member of Parliament (MP) by the first past the post system of election. Hohoe North is located in the Hohoe Municipal district of the Volta Region of Ghana.

Boundaries
The constituency is located within the Hohoe Municipal district of the Volta Region of Ghana. Its southern neighbour  is the Hohoe South constituency.

Members of Parliament

Elections

See also
List of Ghana Parliament constituencies

References 

Adam Carr's Election Archives
Ghana Home Page

Parliamentary constituencies in the Volta Region